Krishnendra Kaur (Deepa) is a former member of the lower house of India's parliament (Lok Sabha). 
She was elected to Lok Sabha from Bharatpur in Rajasthan as candidate of Bharatiya Janata Party. She is from former royal family of Bharatpur. She was born in 1954 and had her education at Maharani Gayatri Devi Girls’ Public School, Jaipur. She has been a member of Rajasthan Legislative Assembly from Nadbai. She is daughter of Raja Man Singh (politician).

Elected to Rajasthan Legislative assembly in 2008.

References

External links 

Women in Rajasthan politics
1954 births
Living people
India MPs 1991–1996
People from Bharatpur, Rajasthan
Members of the Rajasthan Legislative Assembly
Bharatiya Janata Party politicians from Rajasthan
Lok Sabha members from Rajasthan
20th-century Indian women politicians
20th-century Indian politicians
Samajwadi Party politicians
People from Bharatpur district